General Pedro Eugenio Pelletier was a French-born Dominican military figure. He served in the Dominican War of Independence

Biography 
In the Battle of March 30, 1844 in the city of Santiago, he had a prominent role after the Dominican governing board have called the general José María Imbert, who asked to be accompanied, among others by Pelletier, then Colonel and Chief of the main line. So he had his part in the battle, in which Dominican Republic emerged victorious. In April 1855  Pelletier and Gen. Joaquín Aybar were arrested, accused of high treason and sentenced to death, for conspiring against President Pedro Santana; they were pardoned by President Santana in May 1855.

See also 
Antonio Duvergé
Furcy Fondeur
José María Imbert

Notes and references

External links 
 Mi país. Historia: República Dominicana

Date of birth unknown
Date of death missing
French military personnel
Dominican Republic people of French descent
French emigrants to the Dominican Republic
Dominican Republic military personnel
Dominican Republic independence activists